Marwan Aly Elkamash (born 14 November 1993) is an Egyptian swimmer.

He competed at the 2015 World Aquatics Championships and at the 2016 Summer Olympics in Rio de Janeiro. In 2019, he represented Egypt at the African Games held in Rabat, Morocco.

He qualified to represent Egypt at the 2020 Summer Olympics.

References

External links

1993 births
Living people
Egyptian male swimmers
Olympic swimmers of Egypt
Swimmers at the 2016 Summer Olympics
Mediterranean Games bronze medalists for Egypt
Mediterranean Games medalists in swimming
Swimmers at the 2018 Mediterranean Games
African Games silver medalists for Egypt
African Games medalists in swimming
African Games bronze medalists for Egypt
Indiana University Bloomington alumni
Indiana Hoosiers men's swimmers
Swimmers at the 2015 African Games
Swimmers at the 2019 African Games
Swimmers at the 2020 Summer Olympics